The Austrian Women's Curling Championship is the national championship of women's curling in Austria. It has been held annually since 1982. It is organized by the Austrian Curling Association.

List of champions and medallists
(Team line-up in order: skip (marked bold), third, second, lead, alternate(s), coach)

See also
Austrian Men's Curling Championship
Austrian Mixed Curling Championship
Austrian Mixed Doubles Curling Championship

References

Curling competitions in Austria
Women's sports competitions in Austria
National curling championships
Recurring sporting events established in 1982
1982 establishments in Austria
Curling